

Oldwig Otto von Natzmer (29 June 1904 – 1 April 1980) was a German general during World War II.  He was a recipient of the Knight's Cross of the Iron Cross of Nazi Germany.

Awards and decorations

 Knight's Cross of the Iron Cross on 4 September 1943 as Oberst im Generalstab and Ia (operations officer) in the Panzergrenadier-Division "Großdeutschland"

References

Citations

Bibliography

 

1904 births
1980 deaths
People from Legnica
People from the Province of Silesia
Lieutenant generals of the German Army (Wehrmacht)
Reichswehr personnel
Recipients of the Gold German Cross
Recipients of the Knight's Cross of the Iron Cross